The 2023 Imran Khan arrest attempts refer to a series of incidents in Lahore, Punjab, Pakistan, where law enforcement agencies made several attempts to arrest the former Prime Minister Imran Khan in connection with the Toshkhana case. The Pakistan Tehreek-e-Insaf (PTI) claimed that Imran Khan's residence in Zaman Park was underattack and released footage of armed law enforcement officials firing shots. The clash between PTI supporters and security forces continued for two days, during which police and Rangers repeatedly attempted to enter Imran Khan's residence with armored vehicles.

On the second day of the conflict, Imran Khan spoke to the nation via video link, urging the judiciary and establishment to put an end to the "farce" and think about the country's well-being. Imran Khan pointed out that the case against him was being heard at the F8 Katcheri in Islamabad, where explosions had occurred in the past, and that the Interior Ministry had declared his life to be in danger.

Clashes

During the clashes, PTI supporters threw stones at the security personnel, while police officials fired tear gas canisters at the protesters. In retaliation, PTI supporters set fire to a water tanker belonging to the Lahore Waste Management Authority, motorcycles, and other vehicles in the area. They also looted a warden's office on Mall Road.

According to Punjab Inspector General Usman Anwar, 54 policemen were "seriously injured" since the clashes started, while 32 officers received first aid from Rescue 1122. The IG clarified that all roads in Lahore were open to traffic, except those near Zaman Park, and the same was true for educational institutions in the city.

The Islamabad High Court considered a plea against Imran Khan's arrest warrants and asked the PTI to remove objections from the petition. The authenticity of the PTI's footage of armed law enforcement personnel opening fire at Imran Khan's residence could not be independently verified, and it was unclear if it was from that day.

References

2023 in Pakistani politics
2023 in Punjab, Pakistan
March 2023 events in Pakistan
Arrest attempts